Gantz: G (stylized as GANTZ:G) is a Japanese manga series written by Hiroya Oku and Tomohito Ohsaki and illustrated by Keita Iizuka. It is a spin-off to Oku's Gantz manga series. Gantz: G was serialized in Shueisha's seinen manga magazine Miracle Jump from November 2015 to February 2017, while its final chapter was published on the Shōnen Jump+ online platform. Its chapters were collected in three tankōbon volumes.

Publication
Gantz: G, written by Hiroya Oku ( 1–6,  1) and Tomohito Ohsaki (ch. 7–18, vol. 2–3) and illustrated by Keita Iizuka, was serialized in Shueisha's seinen manga magazine  from November 17, 2015, to February 28, 2017. Miracle Jump halted its publication and the last chapter of the series was published on the Shōnen Jump+ online platform. Shueisha collected its chapters in three tankōbon volumes, released from September 16, 2016, to March 17, 2017.

In North America, the manga was licensed for English release by Dark Horse Comics. The three volumes were released between June 13, 2018, and February 27, 2019.

Volume list

Reception
The first volume of Gantz: G sold 22,273 copies in its first week; the second volume sold 28,602 copies in its first week; the third and final volume sold 20,760 copies in its first week.

References

External links

Gantz
Alien invasions in comics
Comics about death
Dark Horse Comics titles
Fiction about death games
Extraterrestrials in anime and manga
Science fiction anime and manga
Seinen manga
Shueisha manga
Teleportation in fiction